Kendra Oluchi Etufunwa is a Nigerian model and actress, best known for her lead role on the M-Net hit TV series Jacob's Cross. She has been featured in top publications such as South African Elle magazine, Glamour (SA) and modeled in advertisements for brands such as Castle Milk Stout, Pepsodent and Knorr. 

In March 2012, the technology company Intel in Kenya and Nigeria, appointed Etufunwa as brand ambassador for their lifestyles' division.

Kendra moved to New York City from South Africa in 2010 and walked the runway for Lilly Ghalichi’s brand “want my look” at the New York Fashion Week on 2012.

Early life
Kendra grew up in the suburbs of Lagos, Lagos State in Nigeria, with her mother and sister. Kendra a daughter of a businesswoman and a retired banker. She studied physical and health education at Delta State University (Abraka Campus). Etufunwa went on to further her education by signing up for a two-year course in human resources at the London school of business, located in Johannesburg, South Africa.

Career
During the 2006 Lagos auditions for the Most Beautiful Girl in Nigeria (MBGN) pageant, she was discovered by an agent and from there started her career in modelling.

Becoming one of Nigeria's most sought-after models, she landed modelling jobs for Diamond Bank, and was also selected to be one of 26 models who appeared on M-Net's Deal or No Deal TV game show. Her first appearance in print was sharing the cover of West African magazine True Love with English television presenter and former footballer John Fashanu.

In October 2011 the producers of hip-hop awards invited Kendra to  present an award at the "Hip-Hop" world awards. Held in Nigeria. On 17 May 2012 Etufunwa was announced as the ambassador for the International African Hair Expo.

Johannesburg
In 2007 Kendra relocated to Johannesburg, South Africa. She was a lead in the TV commercials;  Clorets Gum, Cell C - mobile network and Knorr Cubes, Castle lite beer, Eclairs candy. She has worked on shoots for Cosmopolitan, Elle and appeared in an ad for  Lacoste perfume that featured in Glamour (SA) magazine. Etufunwa has walked the runway on various fashion weeks held in South Africa and around the world, Most notable in a show for UK renowned designer - Karen Millen.

Jacob's Cross
While on holiday, the producers of MNET's Jacob's Cross TV series summoned Kendra to come in for an audition to play the part and supporting role of an angelic daughter by day, and an evil temptress by night.  Kendra's performance impressed the producers, and shortly after she was signed on for another season to become the lead actress.

Television and movie 
Kendra caught the eye of international directors of a Discovery production; Inside Story, following the story of a young girl who falls in love and has to deal with life issues and the contraction of HIV. Inside Story was released to a South African audience in December 2011 and an international audience in Washington D.C. in the United States in January 2012.

References

External links

South African television actresses
Living people
Nigerian female models
People from Johannesburg
Actresses from Delta State
Delta State University, Abraka alumni
1993 births